Kobylany  is a village in the administrative district of Gmina Chorkówka, within Krosno County, Subcarpathian Voivodeship, in south-eastern Poland. The village has a population of 1,100.

References

Kobylany